Ernest Farquet (born 28 November 1975) is a Swiss ski mountaineer.

History

In 2007, in a team with Simon Anthamatten (leader), Marcel Marti and Florent Troillet, he climbed the Matterhorn in a record time of 3 hours 45 minutes. The record was beaten by Andreas Steindl in 2011.

Selected results 
 2006:
 3rt, Zermatt-Rothorn run
 2008:
 3rd, Trophée des Gastlosen, together with Jon Andri Willy
 8th, Pierra Menta (together with Marcel Marti)
 2009:
 9th, European Championship team race (together with Reynold Ginier)

Patrouille des Glaciers 

 2000: 5th (international military teams ranking), together with Pvt E-2 Rolf Zurbrügg and Pvt E-2 Gregoire Saillen
 2004: 6th (and 1st international military teams ranking), together with Cpl Dominique Di Nino and Cpl Stéphane Gay
 2006: 4th (and 2nd in international military teams ranking), together with Cpl Stéphane Gay and Pvt E-2 Pius Schuwey
 2008: 3rd, together with Jon Andri Willy and Martin Anthamatten
 2010: 2nd ("military international" class ranking), together with Thomas Delamorclaz and Antoine Jean

Trofeo Mezzalama 

 2005: 7th: together with Stephane Millius and Philippe Blanc
 2007: 8th, together with Yannick Ecoeur and Alain Rey
 2009: 5th, together with Didier Moret and Pierre Bruchez

External links 
 Ernest Farquet at skimountaineering.com

References 

1975 births
Living people
Swiss male ski mountaineers
Swiss military patrol (sport) runners